Trippettt–Glaze–Duncan-Kolb Farm is a historic home and farm complex and national historic district located at Washington Township, Gibson County, Indiana.  It encompasses seven contributing buildings, three contributing sites, three contributing structures, and two contributing objects.  They include the brick I-house (c. 1850), frame granary (c. 1900), wood frame wagon shed (c. 1920), traverse frame barn (c. 1920), three-portal barn (c. 1920), wood frame tenant house (c. 1920), barn and shed (c. 1910), bunker silo, conservation pond, and the site of a ferry landing.

It was listed on the National Register of Historic Places in 1993, with a boundary increase in 2009.

References

Farms on the National Register of Historic Places in Indiana
Historic districts on the National Register of Historic Places in Indiana
Houses completed in 1850
Buildings and structures in Gibson County, Indiana
National Register of Historic Places in Gibson County, Indiana